The Italian general election of 2013 took place on 24–25 March 2013.

The election was won in Veneto by the centre-right coalition between The People of Freedom and Lega Nord (31.8%), which lost almost a half of its electorate from 2008. The Five Star Movement was the largest party with 26.3%, followed by the Democratic Party (21.3%) and The People of Freedom (18.7%). Lega Nord, the party of President Luca Zaia, fell from 27.1% to 10.5%. Despite coming third in Veneto, the centre-left coalition led by the Democratic Party obtained the most Chamber seats due to the national majority premium, while the centre-right won the regional majority premium in the Senate race.

Results
Chamber of Deputies

|-
|- bgcolor="#E9E9E9"
!rowspan="1" align="left" valign="top"|Coalition leader
!rowspan="1" align="center" valign="top"|votes
!rowspan="1" align="center" valign="top"|votes (%)
!rowspan="1" align="center" valign="top"|seats
!rowspan="1" align="left" valign="top"|Party
!rowspan="1" align="center" valign="top"|votes
!rowspan="1" align="center" valign="top"|votes (%)
!rowspan="1" align="center" valign="top"|seats
|-
!rowspan="5" align="left" valign="top"|Silvio Berlusconi
|rowspan="5" valign="top"|935,404
|rowspan="5" valign="top"|31.8
|rowspan="5" valign="top"|12

|align="left"|The People of Freedom
|valign="top"|549,692
|valign="top"|18.7
|valign="top"|7
|-
|align="left"|Lega Nord
|valign="top"|310,173
|valign="top"|10.5
|valign="top"|5
|-
|align="left"|Brothers of Italy
|valign="top"|44,383
|valign="top"|1.5
|valign="top"|-
|-
|align="left"|Pensioners' Party
|valign="top"|14,474
|valign="top"|0.5
|valign="top"|-
|-
|align="left"|Others
|valign="top"|16,682
|valign="top"|0.5
|valign="top"|-

|-
!rowspan="1" align="left" valign="top"|Beppe Grillo
|rowspan="1" valign="top"|775,862
|rowspan="1" valign="top"|26.3
|rowspan="1" valign="top"|10

|align="left"|Five Star Movement
|valign="top"|775,862
|valign="top"|26.3
|valign="top"|10

|-
!rowspan="3" align="left" valign="top"|Pier Luigi Bersani
|rowspan="3" valign="top"|686,970
|rowspan="3" valign="top"|23.3
|rowspan="3" valign="top"|24

|align="left"|Democratic Party
|valign="top"|628,384
|valign="top"|21.3
|valign="top"|22
|-
|align="left"|Left Ecology Freedom
|valign="top"|53,043
|valign="top"|1.8
|valign="top"|2
|-
|align="left"|Others
|valign="top"|5,543
|valign="top"|0.2
|valign="top"|-

|-
!rowspan="3" align="left" valign="top"|Mario Monti
|rowspan="3" valign="top"|349,353
|rowspan="3" valign="top"|11.9
|rowspan="3" valign="top"|5

|align="left"|Civic Choice
|valign="top"|296,920
|valign="top"|10.1
|valign="top"|4
|-
|align="left"|Union of the Centre
|valign="top"|44,622
|valign="top"|1.5
|valign="top"|1
|-
|align="left"|Others
|valign="top"|7,811
|valign="top"|0.3
|valign="top"|-

|-
!rowspan="1" align="left" valign="top"|Oscar Giannino
|rowspan="1" valign="top"|67,082
|rowspan="1" valign="top"|2.3
|rowspan="1" valign="top"|-

|align="left"|Act to Stop the Decline
|valign="top"|67,082
|valign="top"|2.3
|valign="top"|-

|-
!rowspan="1" align="left" valign="top"|Antonio Ingroia
|rowspan="1" valign="top"|39,608
|rowspan="1" valign="top"|1.3
|rowspan="1" valign="top"|-

|align="left"|Civil Revolution
|valign="top"|39,608
|valign="top"|1.3
|valign="top"|-

|-
!rowspan="1" align="left" valign="top"|Lodovico Pizzati
|rowspan="1" valign="top"|33,274
|rowspan="1" valign="top"|1.1
|rowspan="1" valign="top"|-

|align="left"|Venetian Independence
|valign="top"|33,274
|valign="top"|1.1
|valign="top"|-

|-
!rowspan="1" align="left" valign="top"|Fabrizio Comencini
|rowspan="1" valign="top"|15,838
|rowspan="1" valign="top"|0.5
|rowspan="1" valign="top"|-

|align="left"|Liga Veneta Repubblica
|valign="top"|15,838
|valign="top"|0.5
|valign="top"|-

|-
!rowspan="1" align="left" valign="top"|Others
|rowspan="1" valign="top"|41,318
|rowspan="1" valign="top"|1.4
|rowspan="1" valign="top"|-

|align="left"|Others
|valign="top"|41,318
|valign="top"|1.4
|valign="top"|-

|-
|- bgcolor="#E9E9E9"
!rowspan="1" align="left" valign="top"|Total coalitions
!rowspan="1" align="right" valign="top"|2,944,710
!rowspan="1" align="right" valign="top"|100.0
!rowspan="1" align="right" valign="top"|51
!rowspan="1" align="left" valign="top"|Total parties
!rowspan="1" align="right" valign="top"|2,944,710
!rowspan="1" align="right" valign="top"|100.0
!rowspan="1" align="right" valign="top"|51
|}
Source: Regional Council of Veneto

Senate

|-
|- bgcolor="#E9E9E9"
!rowspan="1" align="left" valign="top"|Coalition leader
!rowspan="1" align="center" valign="top"|votes
!rowspan="1" align="center" valign="top"|votes (%)
!rowspan="1" align="center" valign="top"|seats
!rowspan="1" align="left" valign="top"|Party
!rowspan="1" align="center" valign="top"|votes
!rowspan="1" align="center" valign="top"|votes (%)
!rowspan="1" align="center" valign="top"|seats
|-
!rowspan="5" align="left" valign="top"|Silvio Berlusconi
|rowspan="5" valign="top"|895,425
|rowspan="5" valign="top"|32.8
|rowspan="5" valign="top"|14

|align="left"|The People of Freedom
|valign="top"|523,029
|valign="top"|19.2
|valign="top"|9
|-
|align="left"|Lega Nord
|valign="top"|298,412
|valign="top"|11.0
|valign="top"|5
|-
|align="left"|Brothers of Italy
|valign="top"|38,511
|valign="top"|1.4
|valign="top"|-
|-
|align="left"|Pensioners' Party
|valign="top"|20,631
|valign="top"|0.8
|valign="top"|-
|-
|align="left"|Others
|valign="top"|14,842
|valign="top"|0.5
|valign="top"|-

|-
!rowspan="3" align="left" valign="top"|Pier Luigi Bersani
|rowspan="3" valign="top"|681,501
|rowspan="3" valign="top"|25.0
|rowspan="3" valign="top"|4

|align="left"|Democratic Party
|valign="top"|633,311
|valign="top"|23.2
|valign="top"|4
|-
|align="left"|Left Ecology Freedom
|valign="top"|42,635
|valign="top"|1.6
|valign="top"|-
|-
|align="left"|Others
|valign="top"|5,555
|valign="top"|0.2
|valign="top"|-

|-
!rowspan="1" align="left" valign="top"|Beppe Grillo
|rowspan="1" valign="top"|670,089
|rowspan="1" valign="top"|24.6
|rowspan="1" valign="top"|4

|align="left"|Five Star Movement
|valign="top"|670,089
|valign="top"|24.6
|valign="top"|4

|-
!rowspan="1" align="left" valign="top"|Mario Monti
|rowspan="1" valign="top"|299,906
|rowspan="1" valign="top"|11.0
|rowspan="1" valign="top"|2

|align="left"|With Monti for Italy
|valign="top"|299,906
|valign="top"|11.0
|valign="top"|2

|-
!rowspan="1" align="left" valign="top"|Oscar Giannino
|rowspan="1" valign="top"|50,497
|rowspan="1" valign="top"|1.9
|rowspan="1" valign="top"|-

|align="left"|Act to Stop the Decline
|valign="top"|50,497
|valign="top"|1.9
|valign="top"|-

|-
!rowspan="1" align="left" valign="top"|Lodovico Pizzati
|rowspan="1" valign="top"|29,696
|rowspan="1" valign="top"|1.1
|rowspan="1" valign="top"|-

|align="left"|Venetian Independence
|valign="top"|29,696
|valign="top"|1.1
|valign="top"|-

|-
!rowspan="1" align="left" valign="top"|Antonio Ingroia
|rowspan="1" valign="top"|27,576
|rowspan="1" valign="top"|1.0
|rowspan="1" valign="top"|-

|align="left"|Civil Revolution
|valign="top"|27,576
|valign="top"|1.0
|valign="top"|-

|-
!rowspan="1" align="left" valign="top"|Fabrizio Comencini
|rowspan="1" valign="top"|20,381
|rowspan="1" valign="top"|0.7
|rowspan="1" valign="top"|-

|align="left"|Liga Veneta Repubblica
|valign="top"|20,381
|valign="top"|0.7
|valign="top"|-

|-
!rowspan="1" align="left" valign="top"|Others
|rowspan="1" valign="top"|48,953
|rowspan="1" valign="top"|1.8
|rowspan="1" valign="top"|-

|align="left"|Others
|valign="top"|48,953
|valign="top"|1.8
|valign="top"|-

|-
|- bgcolor="#E9E9E9"
!rowspan="1" align="left" valign="top"|Total coalitions
!rowspan="1" align="right" valign="top"|2,724,024
!rowspan="1" align="right" valign="top"|100.0
!rowspan="1" align="right" valign="top"|24
!rowspan="1" align="left" valign="top"|Total parties
!rowspan="1" align="right" valign="top"|2,724,024
!rowspan="1" align="right" valign="top"|100.0
!rowspan="1" align="right" valign="top"|24
|}
Source: Regional Council of Veneto

Elections in Veneto
General, Veneto
March 2013 events in Italy